Can I Sleep in Your Arms/Lucky Ladies is a studio album by American country music artist Jeannie Seely. It was released in November 1973 on MCA Records and was produced by Walter Haynes. It was Seely's first solo studio album in three years and was her first to be issue with the MCA label. The album produced a total of six singles that were originally released between 1970 and 1973. The record is named for its two major hits: "Can I Sleep in Your Arms" and "Lucky Ladies". It would be Seely's final album for the MCA label.

Background and content
Can I Sleep in Your Arms/Lucky Ladies was produced in several sessions between June 1970 and September 1973. All sessions were recorded by Walter Haynes at Bradley's Barn, a studio located in Mount Juliet, Tennessee. It was Seely's third studio album recorded with Haynes, and second to be recorded with him as a solo artist. The project consisted of 11 tracks. Four of the album's tracks were written by Seely's then-husband and songwriter, Hank Cochran. Among the songs Cochran composed was both of the album's title tracks: "Can I Sleep in Your Arms" and "Lucky Ladies". The record also included a song self-penned by Seely entitled "Farm in Pennsyltucky". In addition, the album contained cover versions of songs previously recorded by other artists. The eighth track, "All Right (I'll Sign the Papers)", was first written and recorded by Mel Tillis.

Can I Sleep in Your Arms/Lucky Ladies was Seely's first studio album to be issued under the MCA record label. Her previous sessions and albums were recorded for Decca Records, however, the label re-titled its name to MCA in 1973. It would also be Seely's solo studio album in three years.

Release and reception
Before the release of Can I Sleep in Your Arms/Lucky Ladies, five solo singles had been released by Seely on both Decca and MCA Records. Four of these singles only reached minor positions on the Billboard country chart, which may have accounted for the lack of an official album release. The first single released in anticipation of the studio album was "Tell Me Again" in October 1970. The song reached a peak position of 58 by December after five weeks on the chart. The second single issued was a cover of "All Right (I'll Sign the Papers)" in October 1971. After spending ten weeks on the country chart, it only peaked at number 42 in January 1972. Decca also issued "Pride" as a single in May 1972. Spending nine weeks charting, it reached a peak position of number 47 on the country chart. The fourth single issued was Seely's self-penned "Farm in Pennsyltucky" in December 1972. It reached number 72 on the country survey after spending three weeks there.

Now transferred to MCA Records, the label issued "Can I Sleep in Your Arms" as a single in June 1973. The song brought Seely her first major hit as a solo artist since 1968, peaking at number 6 on the Billboard Hot Country Singles chart by October. The song's success prompted the release of Can I Sleep in Your Arms/Lucky Ladies in November 1973 on MCA Records. It was originally issued as a vinyl record, with six songs on side one and five songs on side two. The album itself peaked on the Billboard Top Country Albums chart and reached number 15 in February 1974. The album's seventh track, "Lucky Ladies", would be released in December 1973 following the album's issue. The song became another major hit for Seely, peaking at number 11 on the Billboard country singles chart in February 1974. Allmusic would later review the record in years following its official release. The music publication gave the project three out of five possible stars.

Track listing

Personnel
All credits are adapted from the liner notes of Can I Sleep in Your Arms/Lucky Ladies.

 DWJ – mastering
 Walter Haynes – producer
 Jeannie Seely – lead vocals

Chart performance

Release history

References

1973 albums
Jeannie Seely albums
MCA Records albums